The Basilica of Our Lady of the Rosary is a Roman Catholic church and minor basilica in the Sanctuary of Fátima (Marian Shrine of Our Lady of Fátima) in Cova da Iria, in the civil parish of Fátima, in the municipality of Ourém in Portugal.

See also 
 Sanctuary of Our Lady of Fátima
 Chapel of the Apparitions
 Our Lady of Fátima
 First Saturdays Devotion

References

External links 

 
 Pilgrims of Fatima – Official website
 "Fatima in Sister Lucia's own words" – Free online version of the memoir book written by Sister Lucia, O.C.D.
 "The True Story of Fatima" – Free online version of the book written by Father John de Marchi, I.M.C.
 Official Vatican Statement releasing the Message of Fatima
 Video documentary: Portugal in 150 seconds: Fatima

Our Lady of the Rosary
Buildings and structures in Ourém
Roman Catholic churches in Portugal